Apterothrips is a genus of insects belonging to the family Thripidae.

The species of this genus are found in Europe, Australia and Northern America.

Species:
 Apterothrips apteris (Daniel, 1904) 
 Apterothrips secticornis (Trybom, 1896)

References

Thripidae
Thrips genera